William Mungen (May 12, 1821 – September 9, 1887) was a nineteenth-century politician, lawyer, teacher, editor and publisher who served as a Representative from Ohio for two terms from 1867 to 1871.

Biography
Born in Baltimore, Maryland, Mungen moved to Ohio with his parents in 1830 where he attended common schools as a child. He taught school, was editor and publisher of the Findlay Democratic Courier and was auditor of Hancock County, Ohio from 1846 to 1850. He was a member of the Ohio Senate in 1851 and 1852, studied law and was admitted to the bar in 1853, commencing practice in Findlay, Ohio. Mungen was a delegate to the Democratic National Convention in 1856.

Civil War
At the outbreak of the Civil War, entered in the Union Army in 1861 as lieutenant colonel of the 57th Ohio Volunteer Infantry Regiment. He was later promoted to colonel the same year and served until 1863 when he was honorably discharged. Mungen was elected a Democrat to the United States House of Representatives in 1866, serving from 1867 to 1871, not being a candidate for renomination in 1870. Afterward, he resumed practicing law until his death in Findlay, Ohio on September 9, 1887. He was interred in Maple Grove Cemetery in Findlay.

External links
 Retrieved on 2008-02-14

1821 births
1887 deaths
Democratic Party Ohio state senators
Ohio lawyers
American newspaper editors
19th-century American newspaper publishers (people)
Union Army colonels
Politicians from Baltimore
People of Ohio in the American Civil War
People from Findlay, Ohio
19th-century American journalists
American male journalists
19th-century American male writers
19th-century American politicians
Journalists from Ohio
19th-century American lawyers
Democratic Party members of the United States House of Representatives from Ohio